{{Taxobox
| image = Heterocladosoma bifalcatum on rock.jpg
| regnum = Animalia
| phylum = Arthropoda
| classis = Diplopoda
| ordo = Polydesmida
| familia = Paradoxosomatidae
| genus = Heterocladosoma
| species = H. bifalcatum| binomial = Heterocladosoma bifalcatum| binomial_authority = (Silvestri, 1898)
| synonyms=
 Eustrongylosoma bifalcatum Silvestri, 1898
 Australiosoma bifalcatum Brölemann, 1913 	
}}Heterocladosoma bifalcatum' is a common species of millipede found in eastern Australia. 

 Description 
This millipede has a striking colouration: the body is blackish-brown while the legs, antennae and sternites are red. It can be distinguished from other Heterocladosoma by: the largest tibiotarsal branch apically tapering and curving widely laterad; the telopodite of the gonopods being narrow in profile; and the femoro-solenomerite being almost straight.

 Behaviour Heterocladosoma bifalcatum'' can be found in log debris on the ground and also under the bark of trees. The species is most active during overcast/rainy weather and in the early morning.

External links 

Paradoxosomatidae
Arthropods of Australia
Animals described in 1898